Miss Rwanda is a national beauty pageant in Rwanda.

History
Miss Rwanda was organised by telecom company Rwandatel  in 2009 . The 1st edition Miss Rwanda 2009 was held on December 19, 2009 and Grace Bahati was made a history to become Miss Rwanda.

Titleholders 

The Miss Rwanda organization decided to send the winner to Miss World pageant. Meanwhile the Miss Supranational Rwanda set in different organization. The winner goes to Miss Supranational pageant.

References

External links

 
2009 establishments in Rwanda
Rwanda
Rwanda